This is a list of public art in Cardiff, Wales, within the city and county boundary, including statues, sculptures, murals and other significant artworks located outside in public view.

Adamsdown

Bute Park

Canton

Cardiff Bay and Butetown

Cathays

Cathays Park

City centre
The area is bounded by the River Taff to the west, the Civic centre to the north and railway lines and two railway stations – Central and Queen Street – to the south and east respectively.

Grangetown

Heath

Leckwith

Llandaff

Radyr

Riverside

Roath

Splott

Tremorfa

Whitchurch

References

Bibliography

External links
 
 
 

Public art
 Public art
Cardiff
Cardiff
Tourist attractions in Cardiff